Allgäuer is a brewery belonging to the Radeberger Group, with a corporate seat and origin in Kempten (Allgäu), Germany. The company brews a wide assortment of about 20 different beers. The brewery is located in Leuterschach, a district of Marktoberdorf.

History 
The Allgäu Brewery is the result of fusion process in Kempten from 1888 of
Kempten stock brewery
Bürgerlicher Brauhaus (founded by August and Robert Weixler in 1899)
Grünbaumbrauerei (August Schnitzer).
The Allgäu Brewery was founded by the Weixler family on 28 January 1911. In 1921 was acquired the Stiftsbrauerei Kempten, which originated in 1394 and whose tradition became the Allgäuer brewery's own. "The founders wanted to know their company as a pool of Allgäu and Swabian beer interests and they have clearly expressed it with the company name."

See also 
List of oldest companies

External links 
Homepage in German
 

Breweries in Germany
Beer brands of Germany
Food and drink companies established in the 14th century
14th-century establishments in the Holy Roman Empire
Dr. Oetker